Mike van der Zanden (born 9 March 1987 in Tilburg) is a Dutch paraplegic swimmer.

Van der Zanden represented the Netherlands at the 2004 and 2008 Summer Paralympics in Athens and Beijing. In Athens he won the bronze medal at the 100 m freestyle in the S10 class. Four years later in Beijing he finished second in his qualification heat at the 100m butterfly behind David Julian Levecq. His time of 59.97 seconds was the fourth time overall and he qualified for the final. In the final Andre Brasil from Brazil swam a new world record of 56.47 seconds, but Van der Zanden improved his time to 59.39 seconds, again behind Levocq, but in front of Benoît Huot to win his second Paralympic bronze medal.

References 

1987 births
Living people
Dutch male butterfly swimmers
Dutch male freestyle swimmers
Paralympic swimmers of the Netherlands
Swimmers at the 2004 Summer Paralympics
Swimmers at the 2008 Summer Paralympics
Paralympic bronze medalists for the Netherlands
Sportspeople from Tilburg
Medalists at the 2004 Summer Paralympics
Medalists at the 2008 Summer Paralympics
S10-classified Paralympic swimmers
Medalists at the World Para Swimming European Championships
Paralympic medalists in swimming